The Penn Quakers men's basketball program is a college basketball team that represents the University of Pennsylvania. The team plays at the Division I level of the National Collegiate Athletic Association (NCAA). They compete in the Ivy League of the NCAA, where they have been since 1897. They play their home games at Palestra in Philadelphia, Pennsylvania, named after palaestra, the ancient Greek wrestling school. 

The men's team has had 19 official head coaches in its history. The team has played in 2,831 games over 116 seasons of collegiate play from the 1896–97 season to the 2016–17 season (excluding 1897 to 1901, when the Quakers did not play due to low attendance and lack of interest), compiling a record of 1742–1088–1 (.615).

For the first five years they played, the team had no coach. Russell Smith became the first head coach for the team in 1905. In Smith's four seasons as head coach, the team went 74–22–0 (.771), the best winning record out of any of the coaches in team history. The team made their first NCAA tournament appearance in 1953, under Howard Dallmar. 17 years later, Dick Harter was the next coach to bring the team to an NCAA Tournament bid. Under coaches Chuck Daly (1971–1977) and Bob Weinhauer (1977–1982), the team made nine tournament bids in 11 years, including an appearance in the Final Four. Fran Dunphy (1989–2006) compiled the most conference and overall wins as head coach with 310 wins and 191 wins, respectively. He also has the most NCAA Tournament appearances out of any head coach (10), but in nine of those appearances, the team was knocked out in the first round. , Steve Donahue is the current head coach for the team. In his two seasons as head coach, he has compiled a record of 24–32–0 (.429).

List of coaches

Source:

References
General

Specific

Penn

Penn Quakers basketball, men's, coaches